Jean Marquès-Rivière (1903–2000) was a French journalist, writer and screenwriter.

Works
À l'ombre des monastères thibétains, preface by Maurice Magre, Paris, Éditions Victor Attinger, 1930; édition revue et définitive avec une postface de l'auteur postface, Milano, Arche / Paris, Dervy diffusion-livres, 1981.
Les Dangers des plans magiques, Paris, Bibliothèque Chacornac, 1931. Extrait de la Revue Le Voile d'Isis.
La Trahison spirituelle de la Franc-Maçonnerie, Ed. des Portiques, Paris, 1931.
L'USSR dans le monde, Viance preface by Georges Viance, Paris, Payot, "Collection d'études, de documents et de témoignages pour servir à l'histoire de notre temps", 1935.
La Chine dans le monde. La Révolution chinoise, 1912 to 1935, foreword by RP Joseph de Reviers de Mauny, Paris: Payot, "Collection d'études, of documents of témoignages et pour l'histoire serve de notre temps", 1935
with William Henry, Les Grands secrets de la Franc-maçonnerie, Paris, Baudinière, 1935.
L'Organisation secrète de la Franc-Maçonnerie, Paris, 1936.
Comment la France fait la Révolution, Paris, 1938
Amulettes, talismans et pantacles dans les traditions orientales et occidentales, preface by Paul Masson-Oursel, Paris, Payot, 1938.
Histoire des doctrines ésotériques, Paris, Payot, "Aux confins de la  science", 1940; repr. 1971.
Exposition: Le Juif et la France au Palais Berlitz, preface by P. Lézine, Paris, Institut d'étude des questions juives, (sd) [1941].
Exposition maçonnique de Rouen. Guide du visiteur, 1941.
Histoire de la Franc-Maçonnerie française, Paris, 1941.
Rituels Les secrets de la Franc-Maçonnerie, Paris, Baudiniere, 1941.
Sainte Upanisad de la Bhagavad Gita. Introduction, texte et commentaire traduits du Sanskrit, Arche, Milano, 1979.
 Kalachakra. Initiation tantrique du Dalaï-Lama, Robert Laffont, Paris, 1985

References

1903 births
2000 deaths
French male screenwriters
20th-century French screenwriters
Anti-Masonry
French male non-fiction writers
20th-century French journalists
20th-century French male writers